Mollendal is an uninhabited part of Virgin Islands National Park on the island of Saint John in the United States Virgin Islands. The L'Esperance Trail passes through this area.

References

Populated places in Saint John, U.S. Virgin Islands